Gonzalo Jordy Plata Jiménez (born 1 November 2000) is an Ecuadorian footballer who plays as a winger for Spanish club Real Valladolid and the Ecuador national team.

Club career

Sporting
Plata joined Sporting from Ecuadorean club Independiente del Valle for an undisclosed fee during the 2018–19 winter transfer window. Plata scored his first Primeira Liga goal for Sporting in a 2–0 win over Boavista on 23 February 2020.

On 19 May 2021, Plata scored in Sporting's 5–1 win over Marítimo as the club won their first Primeira Liga title in 19 years.

Valladolid
On 31 August 2021, Plata joined Spanish Segunda División side Real Valladolid on loan for the 2021–22 season.

On 11 July 2022, Plata was purchased by Valladolid, signing a contract until 2027.

Career statistics

Club

International

Scores and results list Ecuador's goal tally first, score column indicates score after each Plata goal.

Honours
Sporting CP
Primeira Liga: 2020–21
Taça da Liga: 2020–21
Supertaça Cândido de Oliveira: 2021

Ecuador U20
South American Youth Championship: 2019

Indidivual
South American Youth Championship Team of the Tournament: 2019
FIFA U20 World Cup Bronze Ball: 2019

References

External links

2000 births
Living people
Ecuadorian footballers
People from Guayaquil
Association football midfielders
Ecuador youth international footballers
Ecuador under-20 international footballers
Ecuador international footballers
Ecuadorian Serie A players
Primeira Liga players
Campeonato de Portugal (league) players
Segunda División players
C.S.D. Independiente del Valle footballers
Sporting CP footballers
Real Valladolid players
Ecuadorian expatriate footballers
Ecuadorian expatriate sportspeople in Portugal
Ecuadorian expatriate sportspeople in Spain
Expatriate footballers in Portugal
Expatriate footballers in Spain
2021 Copa América players
2022 FIFA World Cup players